Oxalis obtriangulata is a species of flowering plant in the genus Oxalis. It is native to the forests of northern Japan, Korea, and far east Russia.

Description
It grows white flowers with several thin red-violet stripes on each petal. It blossoms in May.

Distribution and habitat

References

obtriangulata
Flora of Japan
Flora of Korea
Taxa named by Karl Maximovich